George James Bowden MC (17 March 1888 – 8 June 1962) was an Australian soldier and politician.

Early life

Bowden was born at Moyhu, Victoria to farmer William Henry Bowden and Catherine Christina, née McCalman. He attended the Whitfield and Benalla state schools before becoming a commission agent. He enlisted in the Australian Imperial Force on 6 March 1915, in which he rose to captain by 1918. Wounded at Gallipoli and the Western Front (where he was also gassed), Bowden was awarded the Military Cross in 1918 with particular reference to his daring at the Battle of Mont St Quentin.

Party politics

On his return to Australia in 1919, Bowden farmed at Koo Wee Rup in Gippsland. He joined the Country Party in 1923, was elected to Cranbourne Shire Council in 1928 (serving until 1938) and was an unsuccessful candidate for the Victorian Legislative Assembly seat of Mornington in 1935 and 1937. In the conflict between the Victorian and federal branches of the Country Party over John McEwen's decision to support the United Australia Party Government, Bowden was a staunch supporter of McEwen; he also supported Albert Hocking against Premier Sir Albert Dunstan in a dispute over the attempts by the executive to influence the State party.

Although President of the Victorian United Country Party from 1940 to 1943, Bowden was not instrumental in the restoration of unity between the branches due to his military commitments during World War II. He served overseas, but was transferred to the Reserve of Officers in December and was chosen as the Country Party candidate to replace Thomas Paterson in the Australian House of Representatives seat of Gippsland.

Federal politics

With Paterson's support, Bowden won Gippsland in 1943 by a narrow majority, and held it until his retirement in 1961, during which time the seat returned to a safe Country Party stronghold. Although never entering the cabinet, he served as chairman of committees from 1959 to 1961.

Bowden never married, and his health deteriorated in his later years, largely due to his war wounds. Cared for by his sister, he died at Heidelberg on 8 June 1962. He was buried in the Cheltenham Memorial Park (Wangara Road).

References

External links
Friends of Cheltenham and Regional Cemeteries Inc.

1888 births
1962 deaths
National Party of Australia members of the Parliament of Australia
Members of the Australian House of Representatives
Members of the Australian House of Representatives for Gippsland
20th-century Australian politicians